Gary E. Zaruba (April 6, 1940 — October 16, 2014) was an American art educator, painter and potter. He was a professor of art at the University of Nebraska at Kearney, and the director of the Museum of Nebraska Art.

Life
Zaruba was born on April 6, 1940 in Belgrade, Nebraska. He graduated from the University of Nebraska Omaha, where he earned a bachelor's degree, followed by a master's degree from the University of Nebraska at Kearney, and a doctor of education from the University of Nebraska–Lincoln.

Zaruba was a professor of art at the University of Nebraska at Kearney for 39 years, from 1965 to 2004. He was also a painter. He argued that patterns were more important than subject-matters in his paintings. Zaruba also worked in ceramics in the early part of his career. He was appointed as the director of the Museum of Nebraska Art in 1986.

With his wife Mary, Zaruba had two daughters, Janet Anderson and Karen Zaruba. He died on October 16, 2014 in Kearney, Nebraska. His work can be seen at the Museum of Nebraska Art.

References

1940 births
2014 deaths
People from Nance County, Nebraska
University of Nebraska Omaha alumni
University of Nebraska at Kearney alumni
University of Nebraska–Lincoln alumni
American art educators
Painters from Nebraska
American male painters
20th-century American painters
20th-century American male artists
21st-century American painters
21st-century American male artists
American potters